Time Riders in American History is a history-themed, educational video game for DOS released by The Learning Company in 1992.

Plot

Gameplay
The game "features abundant in-game help, lavish production values, compelling cutscenes and scores of easter eggs."

Reception
MobyGames says the game plays "much like an enhanced remake of Where in Time is Carmen Sandiego?". Home of the Underdogs wrote "Another outstanding edutainment title from The Learning Company, Time Riders in American History teaches history of the United States in such a captivating way that kids will not realize that they're learning something... Overall, another great underdog that was sadly overlooked. Thumbs up!" Compute! wrote that the title is a "one well-rounded text adventure". The New York Times felt it was "riding the current historical-games wave". Deseret deemed it similar in concept to Davidson's Headline Harry and the Great Paper Race.

PCGames nominated Time Riders in American History for its award for the best children's game of 1992.

References

Other sources

1992 video games
DOS games
DOS-only games
The Learning Company games
Children's educational video games
Video games developed in the United States